The Catholic Church in the Middle East is under the spiritual leadership of the Pope in Rome. The Catholic Church is said to have traditionally originated in the Middle East in the 1st century AD, and was one of the major religions of the region from the 4th-century Byzantine reforms until the centuries following the Arab Islamic conquests of the 7th century AD. Ever since, its proportion has decreased until today's diaspora tendency, mainly due to persecution by Islamic majority societies. In most Islamic countries, the Catholic Church is severely restricted or outlawed. Significant exceptions include Israel and Lebanon.

The largest group remaining in the Middle East is the Maronite Church based in Beirut, Lebanon, an Eastern Catholic church in full communion with the Pope and the rest of the Catholic Church.

For specific nations (including Eastern Catholic churches), see:
 Catholic Church in Armenia
 Armenian Catholic Church
 Catholic Church in Azerbaijan
 Catholic Church in Israel
 Catholic Church in Iran
 Catholic Church in Iraq
 Chaldean Catholic Church
 Catholic Church in Egypt
 Coptic Catholic Church
 Catholic Church in Jordan
 Catholic Church in Kuwait
 Catholic Church in Lebanon
 Maronite Church
 Catholic Church in Oman
 Catholic Church in the Palestinian territories
 Catholic Church in the United Arab Emirates
 Catholic Church in Saudi Arabia
 Catholic Church in Syria
 Syriac Catholic Church
 Melkite Catholic Church
 Catholic Church in Turkey
 Greek Byzantine Catholic Church
 Catholic Church in Yemen
 Catholic Church in Bahrain

In addition, the Latin Church in the Middle East comprise Latin Catholics, called Latins during the Middle Ages, subject to the Latin Patriarchate of Jerusalem.

Overview

Christianity in the Middle East is characterized by its diverse beliefs and traditions, compared to Christianity in other parts of the Old World. In 2010, Christians were estimated to make up 5% of the total Middle Eastern population, down from 20% in the early 20th century. This was before the devastating civil wars in Syria and Iraq.

Proportionally, Lebanon has the highest rate of Christians in the Middle East, where the percentage ranges between 39% and 40.5%, followed directly by Egypt where most likely Christians (especially ethnic Copts) account for about 10 percent, while in total the largest absolute figures.

The majority of the Lebanese Christians consists of the Maronite Church based in Beirut, an Eastern Catholic church in full communion with the Pope and the rest of the Catholic Church.

Demographics

The second largest Christian group in the Middle East are the Arabic-speaking Maronites who are Catholics and number some 1.1–1.2 million across the Middle East, mainly concentrated within Lebanon. Many Maronites often avoid an Arabic ethnic identity in favour of a pre-Arab Phoenician
or Canaanite heritage, to which most of the Lebanese population belongs. In Israel, Maronites are classified as ethnic Arameans and not Lebanese (together with smaller Aramaic-speaking Christian populations of Syriac Orthodox and Greek Catholics).

The Arab Christians, who are mostly descended from Arab Christian tribes, are significantly adherents of the Eastern Orthodox Church. They number more than 1.5 million. Catholics of the Latin Church are small in numbers. Most Catholics are Maronites, Melkites, Catholic Syrians, Armenians and Chaldeans (from Iraq).Protestants altogether number about 400,000. Arabized Melkite Catholics of the Byzantine Rite, who are usually referred to as Arab Christians, number over 1 million in the Middle East. They came into existence as a result of a schism within the Greek Orthodox Church of Antioch over the election of a Patriarch in 1724.

The Eastern Aramaic speaking Assyrians of Iraq, southeastern Turkey, northwestern Iran and northeastern Syria, who number 2–3 million, have suffered both ethnic and religious persecution over the last few centuries such as the Assyrian genocide conducted by the Ottoman Turks, leading to many fleeing and congregating in areas in the north of Iraq and the northeast of Syria, followed by the Genocide of the Islamic State in the 21st century. The great majority are Catholic Chaldeans. In Iraq, the number of Assyrians has declined to between 250,000 and 300,000 (from 0.8–1.4 million before the US invasion in 2003). Christians numbered between 800,000 and 1.2 million before 2003. During 2014, the Assyrian population of North Iraq collapsed due to the Muslim Jihadist persecution.

A 2015 study estimates 483,500 Christian believers from a Muslim background in the Middle East, most of them belonging to some form of Protestantism.

Decline
The number of Middle Eastern Christians is dropping due to such factors as low birth rates compared with Muslims, disproportionately high emigration rates, and ethnic and religious persecution. In addition, political turmoil has been and continues to be a major contributor pressing indigenous Middle Eastern Christians of various ethnicities towards seeking security and stability outside their homelands. Recent spread of Jihadist and Salafist ideology, foreign to the tolerant values of the local communities in Syria and Egypt has also played a role in unsettling Christians' decades-long peaceful existence. In 2011, it was estimated that at the present rate, the Middle East's 12 million Christians would likely drop to 6 million by the year 2020.

See also
 Catholic Church in Europe
 Catholic Church in Asia
 Catholic Church in Africa
 Catholic Church and Islam
 List of converts to the Catholic Church from Islam
 Eastern Catholic Churches
 Latin Church in the Middle East
 Christianity in the Middle East
 Persecution of Christians

References